Zalaszentbalázs is a village in Zala County, Hungary.

Twin city 

 Szentbalázs

References

Populated places in Zala County